is a Japanese comedian, actor and voice actor. He performs tsukkomi (basically he did not decided if either he perform boke or tsukkomi, but can also perform boke) in the comedy duo Bananaman. His partner is Osamu Shitara. Himura married Aika Kanda, a Television announcer in April, 2018.

Himura grew up in Sagamihara, Kanagawa Prefecture. He is represented with Horipro Com.

Himura has a very recognisable bowl cut hairstyle and is left-handed.

Filmography
To see his appearances as part of Bananaman, see Bananaman (comedy duo)

Variety
Current appearances

Occasional appearances

Former appearances

TV drama

Films

Japanese dub

Advertisements

Video Games

Smartphone Applications

References

Notes

Sources

External links
 

Japanese impressionists (entertainers)
Japanese male voice actors
Japanese television personalities
Horipro artists
People from Hiroshima Prefecture
People from Sagamihara
1972 births
Living people